The Lucas Sullivant House was the house of Lucas Sullivant, founder of Franklinton, Ohio. Franklinton was Central Ohio's first white settlement, and a predecessor to and current neighborhood of the city of Columbus.

Sullivant's house was near 700 W. Broad Street. The brick house had two stories, each with two rooms. A walnut wood staircase connected the floors, supposedly transported from Philadelphia along with bricks and window panes. When it was built, it was largely among cabins and simple frame houses, making its high ceilings, grand staircase, and walnut floors unusual.

The Sullivants first occupied the home in 1801, including Lucas, his wife Sarah Starling, and their three sons (born in 1803, 1807, and 1809). The family hosted numerous large events there, and its extensive backyard was the location for an 1813 conference between William Henry Harrison and indigenous leaders during the War of 1812. The Shawnee, Delaware, Seneca, and Wyandot attended the conference, and Tarhe the Crane agreed there that the groups would support the U.S. cause against the United Kingdom.

Sarah died in 1814, and Lucas in 1823. The couple's sons maintained the house and expanded it, living there until 1854. Around this time, the Order of the Good Shepherd purchased it, making it into a convent. The house remained until 1964, when it was demolished to be replaced with a car dealership.

Portions of the house were preserved, including its front door and doorway, donated to COSI, which was exhibited there for a time along with a recreation of the Sullivant house. In 2019, it was reported that the houses's ornate iron and wood balcony was salvaged as part of an interior wall of the car dealership, a wall made of the house's bricks. After the dealership closed in 2008, the bricks and balcony moved several times, and are today in storage.

See also
 Sullivant Land Office

References

Demolished buildings and structures in Columbus, Ohio
Franklinton (Columbus, Ohio)
1801 establishments in the Northwest Territory
1964 disestablishments in Ohio
Broad Street (Columbus, Ohio)